Yevgeny Nikanorovich Pavlovsky (22 February (N.S. 5 March) 1884, today's Voronezh Oblast – 27 May 1965, Leningrad) was a Soviet zoologist, entomologist, academician of the Academy of Sciences of the USSR (1939), the Academy of Medical Sciences of the USSR (1944), honorary member of the Tajik Academy of Sciences (1951), and a lieutenant-general of the Red Army Medical Service in World War II.

Career
In 1908, Yevgeny Pavlovsky graduated from the St. Petersburg Military Medical Academy. He became a professor at his alma mater in 1921. In 1933–1944, he worked at the All-union Institute of Experimental Medicine in Leningrad and simultaneously at the Tajik branch of the Soviet Academy of Sciences (1937–1951). Yevgeny Pavlovsky held the post of the director of the Zoology Institute of the Soviet Academy of Sciences in 1942–1962. In 1946, he was appointed head of the Department of Parasitology & Medical Zoology at the Institute of Epidemiology & Microbiology of the Soviet Academy of Medical Sciences. Yevgeny Pavlovsky was the president of the Soviet Geographical Society in 1952–1964. Under Pavlovsky's direction, they organized numerous complex expeditions to the Central Asia, Transcaucasus, Crimea, Russian Far East and other regions of the Soviet Union to study endemic parasitic and transmissible diseases (tick-borne relapsing fever, tick-borne encephalitis, Pappataci fever, leishmaniasis etc.). Yevgeny Pavlovsky introduced the concept of natural nidality of human diseases, defined by the idea that microscale disease foci are determined by the entire ecosystem. This concept laid the foundation for the elaboration of a number of preventive measures and promoted the development of the environmental trend in parasitology (together with the works of parasitologist Valentin Dogel). Yevgeny Pavlovsky researched host organism as a habitat for parasites (parasitocenosis), numerous matters of regional and landscape parasitology, life cycles of a number of parasites, pathogenesis of helminth infection. Pavlovsky and his fellow scientists researched the fauna of flying blood-sucking insects (gnat) and methods of controlling them and venomous animals and characteristics of their venom.

Publications and honors
Evgeny Pavlovsky's principal works are dedicated to the matters of parasitology. He authored several textbooks and manuals on parasitology. Pavlovsky was a deputy of the Supreme Soviet of the USSR of the 2nd, 3rd, and 4th convocations. He was a recipient of the Stalin State Prize (1941, 1950), the Lenin Prize (1965), the Mechnikov Gold Medal of the Academy of Sciences of the USSR (1949), and gold medal of the Soviet Geographical Society (1954). Yevgeny Pavlovsky was awarded five Orders of Lenin, four other orders, and numerous medals.

External links

1884 births
1965 deaths
People from Krasnogvardeysky District, Belgorod Oblast
People from Biryuchensky Uyezd
Communist Party of the Soviet Union members
Second convocation members of the Soviet of Nationalities
Third convocation members of the Soviet of Nationalities
Fourth convocation members of the Soviet of Nationalities
Soviet zoologists
Russian parasitologists
Medical school textbook writers
S.M. Kirov Military Medical Academy alumni
Full Members of the USSR Academy of Sciences
Members of the Tajik Academy of Sciences
Academicians of the USSR Academy of Medical Sciences
Employees of the Gamaleya Research Institute of Epidemiology and Microbiology
Soviet lieutenant generals
Soviet military doctors
Soviet military personnel of World War II
Stalin Prize winners
Lenin Prize winners
Heroes of Socialist Labour
Recipients of the Order of Lenin
Recipients of the Order of the Red Banner
Burials at Bogoslovskoe Cemetery
Soviet parasitologists